Ventnor City is a city in Atlantic County, in the U.S. state of New Jersey. As of the 2020 United States census, the city's population was 9,210, a decrease of 1,440 (−13.5%) from the 2010 census count of 10,650, which in turn reflected a decrease of 2,260 (−17.5%) from the 12,910 counted in the 2000 census. The city is part of the Delaware Valley or Philadelphia metropolitan area. 

Ventnor City was incorporated as a city by an act of the New Jersey Legislature on March 17, 1903, from portions of Egg Harbor Township.

History
S. Bartram Richards, the wife of the secretary-treasurer of the Camden and Atlantic Land Company, suggested the name "Ventnor" for the area then being developed by the company south of Atlantic City, having recently visited the English seaside resort on the Isle of Wight with the same name. The name was chosen in January 1889. The city was formally incorporated by the New Jersey Legislature on March 17, 1903.

Chapter 51 of the laws and Sessions of the State of New Jersey provided the beginning to Ventnor City stating, "Be it enacted by the Senate and General Assembly of New Jersey that all part or portion of the County of Atlantic, formerly a part of Egg Harbor Township, situated on Absecon Beach, lying between the Westwardly limit of Atlantic City and the Eastwardly limit of South Atlantic City, the Atlantic Ocean on the south as far as the jurisdiction of the State extends, and to the center of Beach Thoroughfare on the North, be, and is hereby constituted as a City of this State, and all of the inhabitants of the State residing within the limits aforesaid be and they are hereby ordained, constituted and declared to be from time to time forever hereafter one body politic and corporate, in fact and in name, by the name, Ventnor City.  This act shall take effect immediately, and was approved on March 17, 1903."

The first meeting was held on April 20, 1903, in the Carisbrooke Inn, which was located behind the present City Hall, on Atlantic Avenue between Cambridge and Sacramento Avenues; Carisbrooke is also a place name taken from the Isle of Wight.

Geography
According to the United States Census Bureau, Ventnor City city had a total area of 3.52 square miles (9.13 km2), including 1.96 square miles (5.07 km2) of land and 1.57 square miles (4.06 km2) of water (44.52%).

The boardwalk runs along the entire  Ventnor City beach front and is connected to the Atlantic City Boardwalk. It ends at Ventnor City's border with Margate City.

The city borders Atlantic City and Margate City.

Demographics

2010 census

The Census Bureau's 2006–2010 American Community Survey showed that (in 2010 inflation-adjusted dollars) median household income was $52,465 (with a margin of error of +/− $3,688) and the median family income was $66,467 (+/− $9,437). Males had a median income of $42,560 (+/− $12,377) versus $33,693 (+/− $5,007) for females. The per capita income for the city was $34,790 (+/− $4,057). About 9.0% of families and 10.6% of the population were below the poverty line, including 16.1% of those under age 18 and 10.0% of those age 65 or over.

2000 census
As of the 2000 United States census there were 12,910 people, 5,480 households, and 3,255 families residing in the city. There were 8,009 housing units at an average density of 1, 445.0/km2 (3,736.6/sq mi). The racial makeup of the city was 77.10% White, 2.94% African American, 0.19% Native American, 7.45% Asian, 0.03% Pacific Islander, 9.37% from other races, and 2.93% from two or more races. Hispanic or Latino of any race were 17.14% of the population.

The most common ethnic groups reported in the 2000 Census in Ventnor City were Italian (22.8%), Irish (15.5%), German (8.7%), English (6.2%), Russian (4.2%), Polish (3.6%).
 
There were 5,480 households, out of which 23.0% had children under the age of 18 living with them, 42.5% were married couples living together, 12.0% had a female householder with no husband present, and 40.6% were non-families. 33.5% of all households were made up of individuals, and 14.7% had someone living alone who was 65 years of age or older. The average household size was 2.35 and the average family size was 3.02.

In the city the population was spread out, with 20.0% under the age of 18, 7.1% from 18 to 24, 29.6% from 25 to 44, 23.6% from 45 to 64, and 19.8% who were 65 years of age or older. The median age was 41 years. For every 100 females, there were 91.0 males. For every 100 females age 18 and over, there were 87.4 males.

The median income for a household in the city was $42,478, and the median income for a family was $52,701. Males had a median income of $31,300 versus $26,788 for females.  The per capita income for the city was $22,631.  About 3.4% of families and 7.0% of the population were below the poverty line, including 7.8% of those under age 18 and 6.0% of those age 65 or over.

Government

Local government
On September 17, 1968, the existing Mayor-Council form of government was changed to a Commission form of government, under the Walsh Act, one of seven municipalities (of the 564) statewide that use this form. The governing body is comprised of three Commissioners who are elected at-large to serve four-year terms on a concurrent basis in non-partisan elections held as part of the May municipal election. After each election, the three elected commissioners are each assigned a department to oversee and choose one of their members to serve as Mayor.

, the members of the Ventnor City Board of Commissioners are 
Acting Mayor Lance B. Landgraf Jr. (Commissioner of Public Works, Parks and Public Property), 
Tim Kriebel (Commissioner of Public Affairs and Public Safety) and 
Maria Mento (Commissioner of Revenue and Finance; appointed to serve an unexpired term), 
all serving terms of office that end on May 14, 2024.

Beth Holtzman stepped down as mayor in January 2023 as she was moving out of the city. The next month,  Lance Landgraf took office as mayor and administrator Maria Mento was appointed to fill Holtzman's seat as commissioner on an interim basis until the November 2023 general election, when voters will choose a candidate to serve the balance of the term of office.

In the 2016 municipal elections, the Imagine Ventnor slate of Beth Holtzman, Tim Kriebel and Lance Landgraf won election in a field of five candidates, with none of the incumbents running for re-election.

In the May 2012 elections, challengers Mike Bagnell (with 1,213 votes) and Frank Sarno (1,175) won seats on the commission, while incumbent Theresa Kelly won the third seat with 1,164 votes, putting her two votes ahead of Albert Battaglia after provisional ballots were counted.

Michael Advena was sworn into office in November 2011 after winning a special election for the vacant seat that had been held by Stephen Weintrob.

Federal, state and county representation
Ventnor City is located in the 2nd Congressional District and is part of New Jersey's 2nd state legislative district.

 

Atlantic County is governed by a directly elected county executive and a nine-member Board of County Commissioners, responsible for legislation. The executive serves a four-year term and the commissioners are elected to staggered three-year terms, of which four are elected from the county on an at-large basis and five of the commissioners represent equally populated districts. , Atlantic County's Executive is Republican Dennis Levinson, whose term of office ends December 31, 2023. Members of the Board of County Commissioners are:

Ernest D. Coursey, District 1, including Atlantic City (part), Egg Harbor Township (part), and Pleasantville (D, 2022, Atlantic City), Chair Maureen Kern, District 2, including Atlantic City (part), Egg Harbor Township (part), Linwood, Longport, Margate City, Northfield, Somers Point and Ventnor City (R, 2024, Somers Point), Andrew Parker III, District 3, including Egg Harbor Township (part) and Hamilton Township (part) (R, Egg Harbor Township, 2023), Richard R. Dase, District 4, including Absecon, Brigantine, Galloway Township and Port Republic (R, 2022, Galloway Township), James A. Bertino, District 5, including Buena, Buena Vista Township, Corbin City, Egg Harbor City, Estell Manor, Folsom, Hamilton Township (part), Hammonton, Mullica Township and Weymouth Township (R, 2018, Hammonton), Caren L. Fitzpatrick, At-Large (D, 2023, Linwood), Frank X. Balles, At-Large (R, Pleasantville, 2024) Amy L. Gatto, Freeholder (R, 2022, Hamilton Township) and Vice Chair John W. Risley, At-Large (R, 2023, Egg Harbor Township)

Atlantic County's constitutional officers are: 
County Clerk Joesph J. Giralo (R, 2026, Hammonton), 
Sheriff Eric Scheffler (D, 2024, Northfield) and 
Surrogate James Curcio (R, 2025, Hammonton).

Politics
As of March 2011, there were a total of 6,293 registered voters in Ventnor City, of which 1,636 (26.0% vs. 30.5% countywide) were registered as Democrats, 2,012 (32.0% vs. 25.2%) were registered as Republicans and 2,644 (42.0% vs. 44.3%) were registered as Unaffiliated. There was one voter registered to another party. Among the city's 2010 Census population, 59.1% (vs. 58.8% in Atlantic County) were registered to vote, including 72.5% of those ages 18 and over (vs. 76.6% countywide).

In the 2012 presidential election, Democrat Barack Obama received 2,170 votes (51.8% vs. 57.9% countywide), ahead of Republican Mitt Romney with 1,965 votes (46.9% vs. 41.1%) and other candidates with 30 votes (0.7% vs. 0.9%), among the 4,192 ballots cast by the city's 6,861 registered voters, for a turnout of 61.1% (vs. 65.8% in Atlantic County). In the 2008 presidential election, Democrat Barack Obama received 2,372 votes (50.3% vs. 56.5% countywide), ahead of Republican John McCain with 2,257 votes (47.8% vs. 41.6%) and other candidates with 50 votes (1.1% vs. 1.1%), among the 4,718 ballots cast by the city's 7,009 registered voters, for a turnout of 67.3% (vs. 68.1% in Atlantic County). In the 2004 presidential election, Democrat John Kerry received 2,493 votes (52.1% vs. 52.0% countywide), ahead of Republican George W. Bush with 2,205 votes (46.1% vs. 46.2%) and other candidates with 32 votes (0.7% vs. 0.8%), among the 4,783 ballots cast by the city's 6,726 registered voters, for a turnout of 71.1% (vs. 69.8% in the whole county).

In the 2013 gubernatorial election, Republican Chris Christie received 1,806 votes (66.9% vs. 60.0% countywide), ahead of Democrat Barbara Buono with 775 votes (28.7% vs. 34.9%) and other candidates with 40 votes (1.5% vs. 1.3%), among the 2,699 ballots cast by the city's 6,897 registered voters, yielding a 39.1% turnout (vs. 41.5% in the county). In the 2009 gubernatorial election, Republican Chris Christie received 1,548 votes (50.9% vs. 47.7% countywide), ahead of Democrat Jon Corzine with 1,290 votes (42.4% vs. 44.5%), Independent Chris Daggett with 132 votes (4.3% vs. 4.8%) and other candidates with 26 votes (0.9% vs. 1.2%), among the 3,043 ballots cast by the city's 6,549 registered voters, yielding a 46.5% turnout (vs. 44.9% in the county).

Education
The Ventnor City School District serves public school students in pre-kindergarten through eighth grade. As of the 2018–19 school year, the district, comprised of two schools, had an enrollment of 684 students and 70.5 classroom teachers (on an FTE basis), for a student–teacher ratio of 9.7:1. The Ventnor City School District operates two schools for Pre-K–8 within the Ventnor Educational Community Complex. Schools in the district (with 2018–19 enrollment data from the National Center for Education Statistics) are 
Ventnor Elementary School with 376 students in grades Pre-K–5 and 
Ventnor Middle School with 286 students in grades 6–8.

Public school students in ninth through twelfth grades, along with those from Brigantine and Margate City, attend Atlantic City High School in neighboring Atlantic City, as part of a sending/receiving relationship with the Atlantic City School District that has existed since 1920. As of the 2018–19 school year, the high school had an enrollment of 1,796 students and 153.0 classroom teachers (on an FTE basis), for a student–teacher ratio of 11.7:1. The Ventnor district has considered options for an alternative high school sending relationship.

City public school students are also eligible to attend the Atlantic County Institute of Technology in the Mays Landing section of Hamilton Township or the Charter-Tech High School for the Performing Arts, located in Somers Point.

The Roman Catholic Diocese of Camden operated St. James School, a K–8 school, until 2008, when it merged with Blessed Sacrament School in Margate City into Holy Family Regional School (using the St. James site). By 2011 it had a loss of $172,000 and only had 92 students. The sponsoring churches of Holy Family were Holy Trinity Church in Ventnor and St. Gianna Beretta Church of Northfield. The diocese announced that it would close Holy Family at the end of the 2010–2011 school year, as its enrollment was insufficient to cover the deficit. The building was demolished in 2016.

Transportation

Roads and highways

No Interstate, U.S., state or major county highway directly serve Ventnor City. The only numbered roads in Ventnor City are minor county routes, such as County Route 629.

Dorset Avenue Bridge
Dorset Avenue Bridge is a double-leaf bascule drawbridge across the Intracoastal Waterway (ICW) Inside Thorofare. Its operation is federally regulated. The bridge serves as a link in County Route 629.

Public transportation
NJ Transit provides bus service in the city to Atlantic City on routes 504 (from Ventnor Plaza) and 505 (from Longport).

Climate
According to the Köppen climate classification system, Ventnor City, New Jersey has a humid subtropical climate (Cfa) with hot, moderately humid summers, cool winters and year-around precipitation. Cfa climates are characterized by all months having an average mean temperature > 32.0 °F (> 0.0 °C), at least four months with an average mean temperature ≥ 50.0 °F (≥ 10.0 °C), at least one month with an average mean temperature ≥ 71.6 °F (≥ 22.0 °C) and no significant precipitation difference between seasons. During the summer months in Ventnor City, a cooling afternoon sea breeze is present on most days, but episodes of extreme heat and humidity can occur with heat index values ≥ 95 °F (≥ 35 °C). During the winter months, episodes of extreme cold and wind can occur with wind chill values < 0 °F (< −18 °C). The plant hardiness zone at Ventnor City Beach is 7b with an average annual extreme minimum air temperature of 8.0 °F (−13.3 °C). The average seasonal (November–April) snowfall total is ), and the average snowiest month is February which corresponds with the annual peak in nor'easter activity.

Ecology

According to the A. W. Kuchler U.S. potential natural vegetation types, Ventnor City, New Jersey would have a dominant vegetation type of Northern Cordgrass (73) with a dominant vegetation form of Coastal Prairie (20).

Notable people

People who were born in, residents of, or otherwise closely associated with Ventnor City include:

 Chris A. Brown (born 1964), politician who served in the New Jersey General Assembly from 2012 to 2021, representing the 2nd Legislative District
 Wayne Colman (born 1946), linebacker who played for the Philadelphia Eagles and New Orleans Saints
 Royden B. Davis (1923–2002), Dean of Georgetown College
 Walter Evans Edge (1873–1956), Governor of New Jersey from 1917 to 1919 and again from 1944 to 1947
 Angelo Errichetti (1928–2013), politician who served as Mayor of Camden and in the New Jersey Senate before being convicted during Abscam
 Frank S. Farley (1901–1977), New Jersey State Senator who was a Republican political boss in Atlantic County
 Benjamin Foulois (1879–1967), United States Army general and aviation pioneer
 Robert Geddes (1923–2023), architect who served as dean of the Princeton University School of Architecture
 Roland Greenfield (1919–1997), member of the Pennsylvania House of Representatives from the 171st District
 Pinky Kravitz (1927–2015), radio broadcaster and print journalist
 Frank LoBiondo (born 1946), member of Congress from 
 Barry Lubin (born 1952), "Grandma" of the Big Apple Circus
 Siegmund Lubin (1851–1923), German-American motion picture pioneer who founded the Lubin Manufacturing Company
 Sol Metzger (1880–1932), football player and coach
 Charles Henry Parkhurst (1842–1933), clergyman and social reformer who died after sleepwalking off the porch of his Ventnor home
 Greg Roman (born 1972), National Football League assistant coach
 John Roman (born 1952), offensive lineman who played for the New York Jets
 Cathy Rush (born 1947), former women's basketball program head coach at Immaculata University who led the team to three consecutive AIAW national titles from 1972–1974
 Mike Segal (1922–1982), politician and businessman who led the initiative to legalize gambling in Atlantic City
 Valerie Solanas (1936–1988), radical feminist author who shot and nearly killed Andy Warhol
 Justin Williams (born 1981), professional ice hockey right winger with the Carolina Hurricanes who brought the Stanley Cup to Ventnor City Hall in 2012

References

External links

 Ventnor City Website
 Ventnor Educational Community Complex
 
 School Data for the Ventnor City School District, National Center for Education Statistics
 The Downbeach Current

 
1903 establishments in New Jersey
Cities in Atlantic County, New Jersey
Jersey Shore communities in Atlantic County
Populated places established in 1903
Walsh Act